Mandritsara Airport  is an airport in Mandritsara, Sofia Region, Madagascar.

Scheduled services

There are no scheduled flights to the airport.   It is served by Mission Avistion Fellowship.

References

Airports in Madagascar
Sofia Region